There are two places named Mill Plain in the U.S. state of Connecticut:

Mill Plain, Danbury, Connecticut
Mill Plain, Fairfield, Connecticut